The Uttar Pradesh Metro Rail Corporation (UPMRC) is a joint venture company that operates the Lucknow Metro and Kanpur Metro. The UPMRC is also constructing the Agra Metro and Meerut Metro, with the Varanasi Metro, Allahabad Metro, Gorakhpur Metro and Bareilly Metro under consideration. The company is headquarters is at Vipin Khand, Gomti Nagar Lucknow

The Noida Metro, although located in Uttar Pradesh, is not operated by UPMRC and is instead operated by the Noida Metro Rail Corporation (NMRC), a separate company.

History 

The LMRC was formed as a special purpose vehicle by the Government of Uttar Pradesh in 2013 to build and operate the Lucknow Metro.

The formation of LMRC was formally approved by the Cabinet of Uttar Pradesh Government in June 2013.

The SPV was incorporated under Companies Act, 1956 on 25 November 2013, and it got the certificate to commence business on 24 December 2013. The authorized capital of the company was decided to be .

In 2016, to speed up clearance processes for Lucknow Metro, LMRC became a 50:50 joint venture between the Government of India and the Government of Uttar Pradesh. As a result, the LMRC board was reconstituted with five nominee directors being nominated by both Government of India and Government of Uttar Pradesh each, apart from the three full-time directors. Additionally, the Chief Secretary of Uttar Pradesh was replaced by the Union Urban Development Secretary as the ex-officio Chairman of LMRC.

In 2017. the Lucknow Metro was inaugurated and opened to the public.

In 2018, LMRC was reconstituted to cover and implement other metro projects in the state and renamed as Uttar Pradesh Metro Rail Corporation.

in 2021, the Kanpur Metro was open to the public. This was the fastest built and commissioned metro system in the world built in 24 months.

Systems

Operational systems

Systems in development

Services 
Apart from operating Lucknow Metro, UPMRC also provides consultancy services for Metro projects in Uttar Pradesh. UPMRC in association with RITES has prepared Detailed Project Reports (DPRs) for Metro in various cities of Uttar Pradesh. UPMRC is also currently working as an interim consultant for implementation of Agra Metro, and Varanasi Metro projects.

References

 
Rapid transit companies of India
Railway companies established in 2013
Companies based in Lucknow
Indian companies established in 2013
2013 establishments in Uttar Pradesh